ISO 3166-2:OM is the entry for Oman in ISO 3166-2, part of the ISO 3166 standard published by the International Organization for Standardization (ISO), which defines codes for the names of the principal subdivisions (e.g., provinces or states) of all countries coded in ISO 3166-1.

Currently for Oman, ISO 3166-2 codes are defined for 11 governorates. In 2011, the following subdivision changes took place:
Al Batinah Region (Al Bāţinah) split into Al Batinah North Governorate and Al Batinah South Governorate.
Ash Sharqiyah Region (Ash Sharqīyah) split into Ash Sharqiyah North Governorate and Ash Sharqiyah South Governorate.
Ad Dakhiliyah Region (Ad Dākhilīyah), Ad Dhahirah North Region (Az̧ Z̧āhirah), and Al Wusta Region (Al Wusţá) all became governorates.

Each code consists of two parts, separated by a hyphen. The second part is two letters.

Current codes
Subdivision names are listed as in the ISO 3166-2 standard published by the ISO 3166 Maintenance Agency (ISO 3166/MA).

Click on the button in the header to sort each column.

Changes
The following changes to the entry have been announced by the ISO 3166/MA since the first publication of ISO 3166-2 in 1998.  ISO stopped issuing newsletters in 2013.

See also
 Subdivisions of Oman
 FIPS region codes of Oman

External links
 ISO Online Browsing Platform: OM
 Governorates of Oman, Statoids.com

2:OM
ISO 3166-2
Oman geography-related lists